or  is a village in Narvik Municipality in Nordland county, Norway.  The village is located along the southern shore of the Ofotfjorden, southwest of the town of Narvik and the village of Ankenesstranda.  Håkvik Chapel was built here in 1980.  The European route E6 highway runs through the village.

References

Narvik
Villages in Nordland
Populated places of Arctic Norway